The 1971 Yale Bulldogs football team represented Yale University in the 1971 NCAA University Division football season.  The Bulldogs were led by seventh-year head coach Carmen Cozza, played their home games at the Yale Bowl and finished tied for fifth place in the Ivy League with a 3–4 record, 4–5 overall.

Schedule

Roster

References

Yale
Yale Bulldogs football seasons
Yale Bulldogs football